Jacques Dumoulin (February 12, 1898 – February 20, 1988) was a Canadian provincial politician.

Born in Quebec City, Quebec, the son of Philippe-Benjamin Dumoulin and Marie-Louise Taschereau, Dumoulin was the member of the Legislative Assembly of Quebec for Montmorency from 1939 to 1948.

References

1898 births
1988 deaths
Politicians from Quebec City
Quebec Liberal Party MNAs
Taschereau family
Université Laval alumni